Veliki Rigelj is a settlement in the Municipality of Dolenjske Toplice in Slovenia. The municipality is included in the Southeast Slovenia Statistical Region. The entire area is part of the historical region of Lower Carniola.

References

External links
Veliki Rigelj on Geopedia

Populated places in the Municipality of Dolenjske Toplice